Amonette is a surname. Notable people with the surname include:

Ben Amonette (born 1954), American sports shooter
Ruth Leach Amonette (1916–2004), American businesswoman, author, and educator